Halloween: Monster Mix is a Halloween album by American band, Mannheim Steamroller.

Track listing
"The Sorcerer's Apprentice" – 4:46
"Enchanted Forest" – 2:11
"In the Hall of the Mountain King" – 2:47
"The Other Side" – 2:32
"Harvest Dance" – 2:56
"Enchanted Forest II" – 1:45
"The Reaper" – 0:50
"Night on Bald Mountain" – 4:12
"Ghost Voices" – 0:35
"Enchanted Forest III" – 1:33
"Crystal" – 4:16
"Mountain King" – 2:00
"Night Ambience" – 0:52
"Full Moon" – 3:10
"Enchanted Forest IV" – 2:19
"The Flying Dutchman" – 3:33

References

2004 albums
Mannheim Steamroller albums
Halloween albums
American Gramaphone albums